Nyúl is a Hungarian language surname from the Hungarian word for rabbit. Notable people with the name include:
 Ferenc Nyúl (1896–1971), Hungarian football player and coach
 István Nyúl (1961), Hungarian footballer

References 

Hungarian-language surnames
Surnames from nicknames